This is a list of airlines currently operating in Nauru.

See also
 List of airlines
 List of defunct airlines of Oceania

Aviation in Nauru
Nauru
Nauru

Airlines